Neha Harsukh Chavda (born 13 March 1993) is a Gujarati Cricketer. She plays for Saurashtra and West Zone. She has played 4 First-class matches, 41 Limited over matches and 36 Women's Twenty20.

References 

1993 births
People from Gujarat
Saurashtra women cricketers
West Zone women cricketers
Living people